The Ruff Ruffman Show is an American live action/animated children's educational web series produced by GBH Kids for PBS Kids.  It is a follow-up to Fetch! with Ruff Ruffman (2006-2010), with this show focusing on topics of science, rather than the game show format of Fetch!.

Synopsis 
The show features Ruff Ruffman (with Jim Conroy retaining the voice role of Ruff) showing the viewers how to do certain science related hands-on activities and games. Also, the show features some videos of kids asking him questions about certain science experiments. It also teaches children certain science inquiry skills. The topics on the show that are featured include building things, materials, sports, and kitchen science. The show was primarily funded by the Corporation for Public Broadcasting and the U.S. Department of Education's Ready to Learn Program. The show also features Ruff's co-hosts Chet the Mouse and Blossom the Cat, who were also from Fetch!. It is an online show that premiered on September 28, 2017, and ran until October 20, 2017 on PBSKids.org and YouTube.

Episodes

References

External links
 

2017 web series debuts
2017 web series endings
2010s American animated television series
2010s American children's television series
American animated television spin-offs
American children's animated education television series
American flash animated web series
American television series with live action and animation
PBS Kids shows
YouTube original programming
Animated television series about dogs